Luigi Arrigoni (2 June 1890 – 16 August 1987) was an Italian prelate of the Catholic Church who worked in the diplomatic service of the Holy See. He was Apostolic Nuncio to Peru from 1946 to 1948.

Biography
Luigi Arrigoni was born on 2 June 1890 in Morimondo, in Milan Italy. He was ordained a priest on 18 January 1922.

He joined the diplomatic service of the Holy See, where his early assignments included postings in Austria, Romania, and Belgium, which he left when the Nazis invaded. In December 1942, he played the role of courier, delivering messages too important to entrust to normal delivery services to the nunciatures in Bulgaria and Romania.

On 31 May 1946, Pope Pius XII appointed him titular archbishop of Apamea in Syria and Apostolic Nuncio to Peru.

He received his episcopal consecration from Cardinal Clemente Micara on 28 July 1946.

Arrigoni died in Lima on 6 July 1948 at the age of 58.

References

External links

1890 births
1948 deaths
Clergy from Milan
Apostolic Nuncios to Peru
Diplomats from Milan